Veni Vidi Vici is a Swedish comedy web television series created by Rafael Edholm. The plot follows a Danish film director (Thomas Bo Larsen) in decline. His films get bad reviews, and at home he is financially supported by his wife (Livia Millhagen). He is forced to get a real job. It premiered on April 13, 2017 via Swedish online streaming service Viaplay as its third original production.

References

Swedish comedy television series